Seyyedeh Fatemeh Zolghadr is an Iranian reformist politician and a member of the Parliament of Iran representing Tehran, Rey, Shemiranat and Eslamshahr electoral district.

She is daughter of Mostafa Zolghadr, who is another Parliament representative from Minab.

Career 
Zolghadr holds a Ph.D. in Arabic literature and has taught at Alzahra University, Imam Sadiq University and Mazaheb University affiliated with The World Forum for Proximity of Islamic Schools of Thought.

Electoral history

References

1970 births
Living people
Islamic Labour Party politicians
Members of the 10th Islamic Consultative Assembly
Members of the Women's fraction of Islamic Consultative Assembly